1996–97 in Argentine football saw River Plate win both the Apertura and Cluasura championships. Vélez Sársfield won the Recopa Sudamericana and Lanús won the Copa CONMEBOL.

Torneo Apertura ("Opening" Tournament)

Top Scorers

Torneo Clausura ("Closing" Tournament)

Top Scorers

Relegation

Banfield and Huracán de Corrientes were relegated with the worst points averages.

Argentine clubs in international competitions

References

Argentina 1996-1997 by Ian King at rsssf.
Argentina 1990s by Osvaldo José Gorgazzi and Victor Hugo Kurhy at rsssf.
Copa CONMEBOL 1996 by Juan Pablo Andrés and Julio Bovi Diogo at rsssf.
Copa Libertadores 1997 by Karel Stokkermans at rsssf.

 

it:Campionato di calcio argentino 1996-1997
pl:I liga argentyńska w piłce nożnej (1996/1997)